Phascolosomatidea is a subclass of the class Sipuncula, the peanut worms, containing two orders:-

 Aspidosiphonida containing the single family Aspidosiphonidae
 Phascolosomatida containing the single family Phascolosomatidae

Their hooks are arranged in regular rings.

References

Sipunculans
Protostome classes